Gleb Pintilie (born 4 December 1930) is a Romanian former sports shooter. He competed in the skeet event at the 1972 Summer Olympics.

References

External links
 

1930 births
Possibly living people
Romanian male sport shooters
Olympic shooters of Romania
Shooters at the 1972 Summer Olympics